Ronald White, better known by his stage name Ron Ron, is an American rapper and director.

Biography
The name "Ron Ron" was given to him by his grandmother as a child. He decided to keep the nickname in her memory.

Ron Ron is currently an independent artist after a short period with Bungalo Records. He gained minor national attention with a series of mixtapes, one of which including the song "Hey Honey" that secured his first single deal amassing huge totals in digital download sales. He also won 2009 Song Of The Year in Kansas City with "Caked Up", a collaboration with Stik Figa and produced by Greg Enemy.

Albums
 iRONic (2002)
 Ron DMC 1.0

Mixtapes
 Cholie Brown (2005)
 Mr. Mixtape (2006)
 Frank-Einstien (2007)
 Mr No It All (2008)
 Frank-Einstein 2.0 (2008)
 Skitzo-Frinik (2009)
 Left Brain:Right Brain (2011)
 Mr No It All 2 (2013)
 Frank-Einstein 3.0: The Bride Of Frank-Einstein (2014)

References

External links 
 

African-American rappers
Living people
21st-century American rappers
Year of birth missing (living people)
21st-century African-American musicians